The 1898–99 Michigan State Spartans men's basketball team represented Michigan State University (known as State Agricultural College at the time) during the 1898–99 college men's basketball season. The season marked the school's first season. There was no official coach for the team, and the team finished the season with an overall record of 0–2.

Schedule

|-
!colspan=9 style=| Regular season
|-

References

Michigan State Spartans men's basketball seasons
Michigan State
Michigan State|Michigan
Michigan State|Michigan